The 2021 Tunisian self-coup occurred in Tunisia on 25 July 2021 when President Kais Saied dissolved the Assembly of the Representatives of the People and announced the dismissal of the government. The president's decisions were denounced by human rights organizations and considered by several foreign media outlets and Tunisian political entities as a self-coup. The coup came after a series of protests against the Ennahda-led government, economic difficulties, and the collapse of the Tunisian health system due in part to the COVID-19 pandemic in Tunisia.

On the day of the dismissal, Tunisian Parliament Speaker and Ennahda leader Rached Ghannouchi said the president's actions were an attack on democracy and called on his supporters to take to the streets to oppose it. Protests erupted in Tunisia in support of and opposition to the decisions of President Saied. Saied issued a decision imposing a month-long curfew, starting from 26 July from 7 p.m. until 6 a.m. After the 30-day period expired, the President issued a decision on 24 August 2021 to extend the period of "extraordinary measures" he had announced a month before "until further notice."

By autumn, the crisis had escalated. In October 2021, Najla Bouden was appointed Prime Minister, making her the first female prime minister both in Tunisia and the Arab world. She formed a new government to deal with the turbulent economic crisis. On February 6, Kais Saied dissolved the country's top independent judiciary, a move that was condemned by the opposition as a power grab. On February 24, 2022, Saied announced that foreign funding for civil society organizations would be prohibited. He said, "Non-governmental organisations must be prevented from accessing external funds... and we will do that."

Aftermath 
The self-coup occurred on 25 July 2021, after Tunisian President Kais Saied dismissed Prime Minister Hichem Mechichi and suspended the activities of the Assembly of the Representatives of the People by invoking emergency powers from Article 80 of the Tunisian Constitution. The decisions of the president were taken in response to a series of protests against Ennahdha, economic hardship, and prior government responses to the COVID-19 pandemic in Tunisia. The speaker of the Tunisian parliament and leader of Ennahda Rached Ghannouchi said the president's actions were an assault on democracy and called on his supporters to take to the streets in opposition.

Protests have taken place in Tunisia both in favor of and in opposition to the president's actions, while the Tunisian Armed Forces have expressed their support for the president's actions. (See more individual and organizational responses during this period under "Reactions," below.) On 26 July, Saied sacked Minister of Defence Ibrahim Bartaji and acting Minister of Justice Hasna Ben Slimane. Mechichi said that he would hand over power to whoever the president chooses, in a step that could ease the crisis. He said that he would serve Tunisia "from any location." Saied also announced a one-month curfew from 26 July to 27 August 2021.

Since 25 July, a number of parliamentarians and political and human rights activists have been prosecuted for denouncing the president's actions.

On 30 July, Yassin Ayari, a member of parliament and a known critic of President Saied, was arrested at his house by security forces. President Saied's suspension of the Parliament had stripped lawmakers of their immunity. A military judiciary source said that Ayari was imprisoned due to a previous sentence in 2018 which he incurred for criticizing the military. Later on the same day, Maher Zid, another member of parliament, was detained after being sentenced in 2018 to two years in prison for insulting the late President Beji Caid Essebsi. On 23 August, Saied extended the suspension of parliament despite the constitution, which states that parliament can only be suspended for a month. As a result, concerns were raised about the future of democracy in the country.

On 22 September, Saied issued a decree that granted him full presidential powers, allowing him to make changes to Tunisia's constitution and government, including the potential dissolution of the parliament. Earlier that day, Seifeddine Makhlouf and Fayçal Tebbini, both members of parliament, were jailed. Organizations and parties called for a quick resolution to the crisis and formation of a new government. On 29 September, President Saied named Najla Bouden as prime minister and tasked her with forming a new government. She is the first female prime minister in Tunisia and the Arab world.

According to Euro-Mediterranean Human Rights Monitor, several Tunisian judges' freedom of movement was restricted under various pretexts, without appropriate judicial decisions. On 5 August, Al-Bashir Al-Akrimi, the former republic's attorney for the First Instance Court in the capital, and Al-Tayeb Rashid, the first president of the Court of Appeal, were placed under house arrest on charges of corruption and collusion with terrorists. Judge Iman Al-Obaidi, advisor in the criminal department of the Karmbalia Court of First Instance, was prevented from traveling while on her way to Turkey.

In November, a protester was killed by security forces during a demonstration against the reopening of a controlled landfill in Aguereb. The protester died from asphyxiation after inhaling tear gas. The following day, angry protesters burned down a National Guard station in retaliation after security forces withdrew from the area.

Restrictions on the Media 
On May 17, 2022, Euro-Mediterranean Human Rights Monitor and Journalists for Human Rights documented the Tunisian authorities' imposition of restrictions and violations of the rights of journalists as a result of the exceptional measures on July 25, 2021, announced by President Kais Saied. As a result of the exceptional measures, journalists and local and Arab media outlets in Tunisia were subjected to multiple violations, including repression, arbitrary detention, and security and judicial prosecution. Moreover, the report added that the executive authority in Tunisia had issued orders to impose illegal censorship on the media and to restrict journalistic work.

Reactions

Domestic

 Political parties: Several opposition parties have called for a national unity government as the only political solution to ongoing turmoil. Ennahda continues to voice strong opposition to Saied's actions despite internal strife, and four other parties (Democratic Current, Ettakatol (FDTL), the Republican party, and Afek Tounes) formed a coalition against Saied in late September. 
Civil society / NGOs / unions: Unlike opposing parties, Tunisian civil society organizations (such as ATFD, LTDH, SNJT, UGTT, UNFT, UTAP, and UTICA) have had meetings with Saied directly beginning in July. These organizations, associations, and unions have, for the most part, adopted a moderate position toward the president's actions, expressing skepticism toward Saied's one-man rule but applauding his bold stance on entrenched corruption and sharing his acknowledgment of the situation as having reached emergency levels for average Tunisians' living conditions.
Popular response: In regards to the response of the wider populace, Tunisian analyst Ouiem Chettaoui observed: "Once Saied announced his measures, there was celebrations on the streets of few cities across the country—something Tunisians witnessed and felt first-hand with a power no observer who was not there is able to fully understand. Neighborhoods that have been eerily quiet for months in the evenings due to Covid-related curfews erupted in cheers, car honks, and fireworks. Even poorly managed and neglected urban spaces with few parks had their roundabouts turned into impromptu squares filled with dancing, chanting people."
Select individuals: Former President Moncef Marzouki condemned the actions of the President as a clear coup, and that "the main idea we have when writing the constitution is to say that the President is no longer the guy who has all the power... Tunisia was supposed to be a success story in the Arab world. But it’s no longer a success story. But let me remind you that we have this political crisis amidst the worst health crisis that we have ever had in Tunisia."

International
: The Ministry of Europe and Foreign Affairs issued a declaration on 26 July 2021 indicating that France wished for the respect of the rule of law and the return, as soon as possible, of normal functioning of Tunisian institutions. France appealed to all political forces to preserve the democratic advances gained.
: Maria Adebahr, a spokeswoman for the Federal Foreign Office, issued a statement saying "Democracy has taken roots in Tunisia since 2011," but that Germany was "very worried", adding "We don’t want to speak of a coup d’etat. It is important to return to constitutional order as quickly as possible. We will certainly try to discuss (the situation) with the Tunisian ambassador in Berlin, and our ambassador in Tunis is ready to engage in discussions."
: Foreign Minister Ahmad Nasser Al-Mohammad Al-Sabah said that he spoke with the Tunisian Foreign Minister regarding the recent developments.
: The Qatar News Agency cited a statement from the Ministry of Foreign Affairs: "Qatar hopes that Tunisian parties will adopt the path of dialogue to overcome the crisis".
: Kremlin spokesperson Dmitry Peskov said that Russia was monitoring the developments, and that "We hope that nothing will threaten the stability and security of the people of that country."
: Foreign Minister Faisal bin Farhan Al Saud stated that he spoke with Tunisian Foreign Minister Othman Jerandi, and that he "stressed the kingdom’s keenness on the security and stability of Tunisia, and supports everything that would achieve this."
 : Minister of Foreign Affairs Nikos Dendias said that Greece is backing Tunisia's efforts to maintain the stability from the influence of extremists and supporting the efforts undertaken by the president.
: The Ministry of Foreign Affairs, European Union and Cooperation issued a statement declaring that it was following with "concern" the latest developments in Tunisia while calling for "calm and stability" and appealing to the "regular functioning of institutions, with the necessary respect for the rule of law and political freedoms and rights."
: Turkey's Foreign Ministry said that they were deeply concerned, and that "the preservation of Tunisia’s democratic achievements, which is a success story in terms of the democratic process conducted in line with the expectations of people in the region, is of great importance for the region as well as for Tunisia." President Recep Tayyip Erdogan's spokesman, Ibrahim Kalin, issued a message on Twitter: "We reject the suspension of the democratic process and the disregard of the people's democratic will in friendly and brotherly Tunisia. We condemn initiatives that lack constitutional legitimacy and public support. We believe Tunisia democracy will emerge stronger from this process."
: White House Press Secretary Jen Psaki said that the United States was "concerned" about the developments, further stating "We are in touch at a senior level from both the White House and the State Department with Tunisian leaders to learn more about the situation. We urge calm and support Tunisian efforts to move forward in line with democratic principles... There have been a lot of developments even over the last 24 hours. We will look to the State Department to conduct a legal analysis before making a determination [on whether it's a coup]". William Lawrence of the American University said that there was also no way to review the constitutionality of the president's actions, as a Constitutional Court required by the 2014 constitution hadn't yet been established amongst a lack of consensus between various levels of government.

Supranational
 Arab League: The Arab League issued a statement, saying "The…League urges Tunisia to quickly get through the current turbulent phase, restore stability and calm and the state’s ability to work effectively to respond to the aspirations and requirements of the people."
 European Union: A spokeswoman for the European Commission stated that "We are closely following the latest developments in Tunisia, [and] call on all Tunisian actors to respect the Constitution, its institutions and the rule of law. We also call on them to remain calm and to avoid any resort to violence in order to preserve the stability of the country."
The International Monetary Fund offered to continue assisting the country with the fallout of the COVID-19 pandemic: "Tunisia continues to face extraordinary socio-economic pressures, including as a result of the COVID-19 pandemic, which is causing tragic loss of life, and Tunisian’s unmet aspirations for higher, job-rich, and inclusive growth." Tunisia had requested a three-year $4 billion loan "to help stabilise its balance of payments position after its current account deficit widened to 7.1 percent of GDP last year."
 United Nations: A spokesperson for Secretary-General of the United Nations António Guterres, Farhan Haq, called on both sides to "exercise restraint, refrain from violence and ensure that the situation remains calm. All disputes and disagreements should be resolved through dialogue."

Other
 Al Jazeera said that their Tunisian bureau was raided by security forces on 26 July, and that journalists were expelled from the country.
 Amnesty International called for the government to "publicly commit to respecting and protecting human rights, including the rights to freedom of expression, association and peaceful assembly." Both it and Reporters Without Borders condemned the raid on Al Jazeera.
 Human Rights Watch stated that the declaration of Presidential Decree No. 117 implicitly revoking the constitutional order in Tunisia is a first step towards authoritarianism. The decision threatens the human rights and democratic aspirations of the Tunisian people.

See also
2021 Tunisian protests
Political impact of the COVID-19 pandemic

References

Political crisis
Political crisis
2021 protests
2022 protests
2021 political crisis
Government crises
July 2021 events in Africa
2021 political crisis
Impact of the COVID-19 pandemic on politics